Zorigtyn Battulga (born 19 September 1986) is a Mongolian international footballer. He made his first appearance for the Mongolia national football team in 2007.

References

1986 births
Mongolian footballers
Mongolia international footballers
Mongolia national football team managers
Mongolian football managers
Erchim players
Living people
Association football forwards